The Nickelodeon Kids Choice Awards Mexico is an annual awards show that awards entertainers with a blimp trophy, as voted by children on the Internet. The show is usually held in September and televised days later through Nickelodeon.

Hosts

Editions 
2010 edition

In June 2010, Viacom gave the rights for Mexico to release their own version of the Kids' Choice Awards. The awards ceremony took place on 4 September 2010 at "El Teatro Chino de Six Flags" (The Chinese Theater of Six Flags) of the Six Flags México park. It was presented by Omar Chaparro and Anahí. The show was not televised until 14 October 2010.

The award show was a low-budget production. Presented via a 'giant screen' were special messages from the cast of iCarly (Miranda Cosgrove, Jennette McCurdy, Nathan Kress, Jerry Trainor and Noah Munck), and Canadian singer Justin Bieber in acceptance of their wins for the categories of Favorite TV Show and Favorite Song respectively.

2011 edition

Filmed on 3 September 2011 in Six Flags, Mexico, and premiered on September 22 at 7:30 p.m.. It was hosted by Danna Paola and Brian Amadeus from Moderatto. Some of the winners were Big Time Rush For Favorite International TV Show and Favorite International Artist, and Katy Perry for Favorite Song, and Grachi was the biggest winner of the night with three awards won, including Favorite TV Show.

2012 edition

It was confirmed a 3rd edition for the KCA México, it took place on Pepsi Center on 1 September 2012, and was first telecast on 18 September at 7 p.m., it was hosted by Jaime Camil, the greatest winner was Miss XV, some international winners were iCarly for Favorite International TV Show and One Direction for Favorite International Artist and Favorite Song.

2013 edition

The "Kids Choice Awards Mexico 2013" were held on 31 August 2013 at the Pepsi Center in Mexico City, Jaime Camil was the host again, and the Colombian categories were presented by Colombian actor Andrés Mercado. Some of the winners were Victorious for "Favorite TV Show", Big Time Rush for "Favorite International Artist" and One Direction for "Favorite Song".
2014 edition
The awards ceremony were held on 20 September  but aired on Nickelodeon on 25 September  the hosts were singer Paty Cantú and presenter Roger González.
2015 edition
The awards took place on 15 August 2015 at the National Auditorium, the presenters were the singers Maite Perroni and Mario Bautista.
2016 edition
The awards were held on 20 August 2016 in Mexico City, the broadcast on Nickelodeon took place only on 23 August 2016, the presenters were Galilea Montijo and the colombian YouTuber Sebastián Villalobos, with musical performances of Dulce María, CD9, Sebastián Yatra, Urband 5 and Ha*Ash.
2017 edition
The awards were held on 19 August 2017 in Mexico City, the broadcast on Nickelodeon took place only on 22 August 2017, the presenters were Mario Bautista and YouTuber Caeli, had music performances from Río Roma, Fifth Harmony, CNCO and Pitbull.
2018 edition
The event took place on 18 August 2018 at the National Auditorium in Mexico City. It was broadcast by Nickelodeon Latin America on the 21st of August and was presented by the trio of YouTubers Lesslie Yadid, Ana Karen and Rafael Velázquez (Los Polinesios).

2019 edition
The event took place on 17 August 2019 at the National Auditorium in Mexico City. It was broadcast on Nickelodeon Latin America on the 20th of August and was hosted by Youtuber La Bala and Jaime Camil for the third occasion.

2020 edition
Due to the COVID-19 pandemic, the event took place on 3 November 2020 in the format of a virtual show, it was presented by Camilo and Evaluna Montaner.

2021 edition
The edition of the Kids' Choice Awards Mexico 2021 was held on September 7, 2021 through Nickelodeon. As in the previous year, the awards were held virtually and were hosted by internet personalities Bryan SKabeche, Eddy SKabeche and Fede Vigevani. The ceremony, in addition to being broadcast on the channel, was broadcast live on YouTube and Facebook.

2022 edition
The edition of the Kids' Choice Awards México 2022 was held on August 30, 2022 through Nickelodeon. For the first time in 2 years, it will be face-to-face and will be hosted by personalities Alex Hoyer, Danna Paola and Luis de la Rosa. The ceremony, in addition to being broadcast on the channel, was broadcast live on YouTube and Facebook on Pluto TV.

See also
 Nickelodeon Kids' Choice Awards
 Kids' Choice Awards Argentina
Kids' Choice Awards Colombia
 Meus Prêmios Nick

References

Awards established in 2003
Awards established in 2010
Nickelodeon Kids' Choice Awards
Spanish-language Nickelodeon original programming